The Institute of Road Transport Engineers, is a UK based membership institution, with global branches, originally
founded in 1944, In 2001 it agreed that it would found the Society of Operational Engineers when it was approached by the Institution of Plant Engineers who needed external support. IRTE continues as a best practice professional sector of SOE, and publishes the monthly magazine Transport Engineer, as well as a wide range of technical guides. IRTE historically held very successful commercial transport shows and conferences and is a partner in the National CV Show, a very successful commercial vehicle exhibition. 
 
The Irtec license is a professional certification for auto technicians in the U.K.  Established in 2002, the Irtec licence is a voluntary scheme that assesses the competence of automotive technicians who maintain and repair vehicles in the following 4 classes; Heavy Goods Vehicle (above 7.5t), Light Commercial Vehicle (below 7.5t), Light & Heavy Commercial Vehicle (combined) and Bus and Coach. An Irtec licence certifies the individual, rather than the employer, and can be used to demonstrate a common standard of skills from one company to the next.

The Irtec licence is offered at several benchmark levels:
Vehicle Safety and Inspection Technician Licence
Service Maintenance and Repair Technician Licence
Advanced Technician Licence
Master Technician Licence

External links
Society of Operations Engineers
IRTEC Licensing Scheme
irtec Homepage

Professional certification in engineering
Engineering societies based in the United Kingdom
Organizations established in 1944
Road transport in the United Kingdom
Transport organisations based in the United Kingdom